Keenan Davis (born January 30, 1991) is an American football wide receiver who is currently a free agent. He was signed by the Miami Dolphins and the Cleveland Browns as an undrafted free agent in 2013. He played college football at Iowa.

Professional career
Davis was signed as an undrafted free agent by the Cleveland Browns on April 27, 2013. He was released by the Cleveland Browns on July 24, 2013. Davis was signed by the Miami Dolphins on July 31, 2013. He was released on August 31, 2013.

On November 17, 2014, Davis was assigned to the Spokane Shock of the Arena Football League. He was placed on recallable reassignment on March 14, 2015.

References

External links
 Miami Dolphins bio
 Cleveland Browns bio
 Iowa Hawkeyes bio

1991 births
Living people
Sportspeople from Cedar Rapids, Iowa
American football wide receivers
Iowa Hawkeyes football players
Cleveland Browns players
Miami Dolphins players
Spokane Shock players